Chainpur is a village in the Chainpur CD block in the Chainpur subdivision of the Gumla district in the Indian state of Jharkhand.

Geography

Location                           
Chainpur is located at

Area overview 
The map alongside presents a rugged area, consisting partly of flat-topped hills called pat and partly of an undulating plateau, in the south-western portion of Chota Nagpur Plateau. Three major rivers – the Sankh, South Koel and North Karo - along with their numerous tributaries, drain the area. The hilly area has large deposits of Bauxite. 93.7% of the population lives in rural areas.

Note: The map alongside presents some of the notable locations in the district. All places marked in the map are linked in the larger full screen map.

Civic administration 
There is a police station at Chainpur.

The headquarters of Chainpur CD block are located at Chainpur village.

Demographics 
According to the 2011 Census of India, Chainpur had a total population of 6,507, of which 3,300 (51%) were males and 3,207 (49%) were females. Population in the age range 0–6 years was 830. The total number of literate persons in Chainpur was 5,014 (88.32% of the population over 6 years).

(*For language details see Chainpur block#Language and religion)

Education
Paramvir Albert Ekka Memorial College was established at Chainpur in 1975. Affiliated with Ranchi University, it offers honours courses in Hindi, Sanskrit, political science, history, economics, geography and a general course in arts. It also has facilities for teaching in classes XI and XII.

Lutheran High School Chainpur is a Hindi-medium coeducational institution established in 1947. It has facilities for teaching from class VI to class X. The school has a playground, a library with 2,595 books and has 2 computers for teaching and learning purposes.

St. Anna Girls High School Chainpur is a Hindi-medium girls only institution established in 1958. It has facilities for teaching from class VI to class X.  The school has a playground, a library with 500 books and has 10 computers for teaching and learning purposes.

St. Xavier's School Chainpur is an English-medium coeducational institution established in 1996. It has facilities for teaching from class I to class X. The school has a library with 450 books and has 2 computers for teaching and learning purposes.

Project High School Chainpur is a Hindi-medium coeducational school established in 1982. It has facilities for teaching from class VIII to class XII. The school has a playground and a library with 529 books.

References 

Villages in Gumla district